Prideaux John Selby FRSE FLS (23 July 1788 – 27 March 1867) was an English ornithologist, botanist and natural history artist.

Life

Selby was born in Bondgate Street in Alnwick in Northumberland, the eldest son of George Selby of Beal and Twizell (d.1804), and his wife, Margaret Cook. He was educated at Durham School.

He studied at University College, Oxford. He succeeded in 1804 to the family estates at Beal, and added to the landholdings there at a cost of some £14000 in about 1840.
 
He died at Twizell House and was buried in Bamburgh churchyard.

Family

In 1810, he married Lewis Tabitha Mitford (1782–1859) daughter of Bertram Osbaldeston Mitford (1748–1800) of Dennet's Hall in Leicester. They had three daughters.

Work

Selby is best known for his Illustrations of British Ornithology (1821–1834), the first set of life-sized illustrations of British birds. He also wrote Illustrations of Ornithology with William Jardine and A History of British Forest-trees (1842).

Many of the illustrations in his works were drawn from specimens in his collection. In addition to the above works he contributed to Jardine's Naturalist's Library the volumes on the pigeons (1835) and the parrots (1836), the latter illustrated by Edward Lear. He was for some time one of the editors of the Magazine of Zoology and Botany.

His collections were sold in 1885 and became dispersed. The South African birds collected by Andrew Smith went to the Zoology Museum of the University of Cambridge.

See also
 :Category:Taxa named by Prideaux John Selby
 Thomas Bewick and his History of British Birds
 William Yarrell

References

Further references
Bowey, K. and Newsome, M. (Ed) 2012. The Birds of Durham. Durham Bird Club.

Bibliography

 Mullens; Swann. (1918). A Bibliography of British Ornithology.
 Raine, Revd. James (1852). The History and Antiquities of North Durham. p338
 Jackson, Christine E. (2004). Oxford Dictionary of National Biography.

External links
 Gallery of Prideaux John Selby art
 Selby, Prideaux John (1836) Natural history of parrots Edinburgh: W. H. Lizars. - digital facsimile from Linda Hall Library
 A collection of ornithological prints from Selby's 1833 British ornithology and his 1835 The natural history of pigeons. - Linda Hall Library

1788 births
1867 deaths
People from Alnwick
English botanists
Botanists with author abbreviations
British illustrators
English ornithologists
Alumni of University College, Oxford
19th-century English people
British bird artists
Prideaux
Fellows of the Royal Society of Edinburgh